L'horloge fleurie, or the flower clock,  is an outdoor flower clock located on the western side of Jardin Anglais park in Geneva, Switzerland.

Around 6,500 flowering plants and shrubs are used for the clock face. The plants are changed as the seasons change.

History
The clock was created in 1955 as a symbol of the city's watchmakers, and a dedication to nature.  

References

External links 

 Ville-geneve.ch: official L'horloge fleurie website—, Patrimoine et monuments, Monuments et lieux d'intérêt.
Great Magazine of Timepieces » Geneva Watch Tour
 Geneva's best watchmaking landmarks
 CitySeeker.com:  L'Horloge Fleurie, Geneva
 Things to see in Geneva — Jardin Anglais (English Garden) and L'horloge Fleurie (Flower Clock).
 L’Horloge Fleurie – The World’s Most Beautiful Clock
Patrimoine-horloge.fr: Horloge fleuri de Lviv, Ukraine

Clocks in Switzerland
Individual clocks
Buildings and structures in Geneva
Gardens in Switzerland
Tourist attractions in Geneva